North American archaeological periods  divides the history of pre-Columbian North America into a number of named successive eras or periods, from the earliest-known human habitation through to the early Colonial period which followed the European colonization of the Americas.

Stage classification

One of the most enduring classifications of archaeological periods and cultures was established in Gordon Willey and Philip Phillips' 1958 book Method and Theory in American Archaeology. They divided the archaeological record in the Americas into 5 phases, only three of which applied to North America. The use of these divisions has diminished in most of North America due to the development of local classifications with more elaborate breakdowns of times.

1. The Paleo-Indians stage and/or Lithic stage
2. The Archaic stage
3. Formative stage or Post-archaic stage - At this point the North American classifications system differs from the rest of the Americas.

For more details on the five major stages, still used in Mesoamerican archaeology, see Mesoamerican chronology and Archaeology of the Americas.

Table of archaeological periods North America

Culture, phase, and chronological table for the Mississippi Valley

See also
Archaeogenetics
Archaeological culture
Archaeology of the Americas
List of archaeological periods
Genetic history of indigenous peoples of the Americas

Notes

References

Bibliography

Milanich, Jerald T. (1998) Florida's Indians from Ancient Times to the Present. University Press of Florida. 
Milanich, Jerald T. (1994) Archaeology of Precolumbian Florida.  University Press of Florida. 

Philip Phillips (1970). Archaeological Survey In The Lower Yazoo Basin, Mississippi, 1949-1955(Part One). Published by the Peabody Museum, Cambridge, Massachusetts. Library of Congress Catalog Card No. 77-80028.

Periods
History of indigenous peoples of North America
North America, Archaeological Periods
North America, Archaeological Periods
Archaeology, North America, Periods
North America, Archaeological Periods
North America-related lists
United States history-related lists